Luigi Mastrangelo (born August 17, 1975 in Mottola, Italy) is an Italian men's volleyball player, a member of Italy men's national volleyball team 1999-2012. Mastrangelo with national team winner silver and bronze medalist of the Olympic Games, multiple winner of the European Championship and World League. He was the star of the Italian team in their course.

Career

Clubs

Sporting achievements

Individually
 1999 FIVB World League - Best Server
 2001 FIVB World League - Best Server
 2003 CEV European Championship - Best Blocker
 2004 FIVB World League - Best Blocker
 2005 CEV European Championship - Best Blocker
 2008 CEV Cup - Best Blocker
 2008 CEV Cup - Best Server
 2009 Volleyit Magazine - Player of the Year Italy
 2011 Memorial of Hubert Jerzy Wagner - Best Blocker

State awards
 2000  Knight's Order of Merit of the Italian Republic
 2004  Officer's Order of Merit of the Italian Republic

External links
 NBC Olympics profile
 

1975 births
Living people
Sportspeople from the Province of Taranto
Italian men's volleyball players
Olympic volleyball players of Italy
Volleyball players at the 2000 Summer Olympics
Volleyball players at the 2004 Summer Olympics
Volleyball players at the 2008 Summer Olympics
Volleyball players at the 2012 Summer Olympics
Medalists at the 2000 Summer Olympics
Medalists at the 2004 Summer Olympics
Medalists at the 2012 Summer Olympics
Olympic silver medalists for Italy
Olympic bronze medalists for Italy
Olympic medalists in volleyball
Italian Champions of men's volleyball